John Drought Lauder (January 26, 1854 – 1934) was a Canadian territorial level politician, rancher, police officer civil servant and medical doctor. As a police officer for the North-West Mounted Police he saw active service during the North-West Rebellion. He served as a member of the Legislative Assembly of the North-West Territories from 1885 until 1888.

Early life
John Drought Lauder was born in Trim, Ireland in 1855. He went to post secondary education at Trinity College, Dublin and learned medicine. He moved to North America, arriving in Fort Macleod, North-West Territories in 1876. Shortly after arriving he joined the North-West Mounted Police. As a police officer Lauder saw active combat duties during the North-West Rebellion. He was part of the Alberta Field Force led by Major General Thomas Bland Strange and served at the battle of Battle of Frenchman's Butte.

Lauder was a pioneer cattle rancher. He settled in the Innisfail, area in the central portion of the District of Alberta. He registered the second cattle brand with the North-West Territories government. He married his wife Marguerite Thomson, a French woman from Quebec in Calgary in 1885. They would have five children together. As a civil servant Lauder worked as an Indian agent on the Blackfoot Reserve.

Political career
Lauder was elected to the North-West Territories Legislature in his first attempt as a candidate. He won first of two places in the Calgary electoral district in the July 14, 1886 by-election. Lauder won almost 34% of the popular vote. He was 37 votes ahead of Hugh Caley who won the second seat in the vote. He served in the legislature until it was dissolved in 1888 choosing not to run again.

Lauder ran for a second term in office 14 years later in the 1902 North-West Territories general election. He was defeated by John Simpson losing by 21 votes in the Innisfail electoral district.

Late life
Lauder lived out his entire life in the Innisfail area of Alberta. He died in 1934.

References

1855 births
1934 deaths
Members of the Legislative Assembly of the Northwest Territories
Alumni of Trinity College Dublin
Royal Canadian Mounted Police officers